Arthur Howie Hart (10 June 1905 – 12 May 1989) was an Australian rules footballer who played for the Brunswick Football Club in the Victorian Football Association (VFA), and the St Kilda Football Club in the Victorian Football League (VFL).

Family
The son of Adam Hart (1859-1941), and Ellen Matilda "Nellie" Hart (1876-1933), née Collins, Arthur Howie Hart was born at Beulah, Victoria on 10 June 1905.

He married Minna Elizabeth Wilson (1907-2000) on 22 May 1931.

Military service
A schoolteacher at Mildura High School, he enlisted in the Australian Volunteer Defence Corps in March 1942.

Death
He died at Mill Park, Victoria on 12 May 1989.

Notes

References
 'Victor', "First Kick at Fourteen; Playing Senior Football at Nineteen", The Sporting Globe, (Saturday, 23 August 1924), p.8.
 Ambition Achieved: Arthur Hart's Record, The Weekly Times, (Saturday, 27 September 1930), p.74.
 Holmesby, Russell & Main, Jim (2014), The Encyclopedia of AFL Footballers: every AFL/VFL player since 1897 (10th ed.), Seaford, Victoria: BAS Publishing. 
 World War Two Nominal Roll: Lieutenant Arthur Howie Hart (V361175), Department of Veterans' Affairs.
 World War Two Service Record: Lieutenant Arthur Howie Hart (V361175), National Archives of Australia.

External links 
 
 
 Arthur Hart, at The VFA Project.

1905 births
1989 deaths
Australian rules footballers from Victoria (Australia)
Australian Rules footballers: place kick exponents
Brunswick Football Club players
St Kilda Football Club players
Stawell Football Club players